The 2022 Alaska House of Representatives elections were held on Tuesday, November 8, 2022, with the primary election on August 16, 2022. Voters in the 40 districts of the Alaska House of Representatives elected their representatives, in conjunction with state senate elections and the biennial United States elections for federal offices.

Background
In 2020, Alaskan voters approved Ballot Measure 2, an initiative to implement a nonpartisan blanket top-four primary with a single, open primary where candidates from all parties are listed on the ballot and the top four vote getters advance to the general election. The general election is then resolved using instant-runoff voting, where voters rank the candidates and the candidates receiving the lowest votes are eliminated one by one until one candidate has a majority. The first elections using the new system will be the 2022 election cycle. As of the close of candidate filing, only one election for the Alaska House of Representatives had more than four candidates.

Predictions

Overview

Primary elections

General election 
Eight candidates withdrew from the general election after advancing from the primary. In District 35, Independent Tim Parker withdrew and was replaced on the general election ballot by Kieran Brown of the Alaska Constitution Party.

Summary of results

Retiring incumbents
District 2: Steve Thompson (R)
District 13: Chris Tuck (D)
District 14: Kelly Merrick (Coalition R) (ran for state senate)
District 16: Ivy Spohnholz (D)
District 19: Geran Tarr (D) (ran for state senate)
District 21: Matt Claman (D) (ran for state senate)
District 22: Sara Rasmussen (Independent R)
District 24: Ken McCarty (R) (ran for state senate)
District 27: Christopher Kurka (R) (ran for governor)
District 27: Liz Snyder (D)
District 28: James Kaufman (R) (ran for state senate)
District 35: Jonathan Kreiss-Tomkins (D)
District 35: Adam Wool (D) (ran for U.S. House)
District 38: Tiffany Zulkosky (D)

Detailed results

District 1
Primary

General election

District 2
Primary

General election
Himschoot said she planned on joining the bipartisan coalition if elected.

District 3
Primary

General election

District 4
Primary

General election

District 5
Primary

General election

District 6
Primary

General election

District 7
Primary

General election

District 8
Primary

General election

District 9
Primary

General election

District 10
Primary

General election
Sue Levi withdrew after the primary.

District 11
Primary

General election
Featherly expressed willingness to join a bipartisan coalition if he won.
{| class="wikitable sortable" style="text-align:right"
|+ colspan=6 | 2022 Alaska House of Representatives election, District 11
|-
! colspan=2 rowspan=2 | Party
! rowspan=2 | Candidate
! colspan=3 | First Choice
! colspan=3 | Round 1
! colspan=3 | Round 2
|-
! Votes
! %
! Transfer
! Votes
! %
! Transfer
! Votes
! %
|-
! style="background-color:" |
| style="text-align:left" | Republican
| style="text-align:left" scope="row" | 
| 2,952
| 38.6
| 49
| 3,001
| 39.1
| +676
| 3,677
| 50.8
|-
! style="background-color:" |
| style="text-align:left" | Independent
| style="text-align:left" scope="row" | 
| 3,476
| 45.5
| 8
| 3,484
| 45.4
| +81
| 3,565
| 49.2
|-
! style="background-color:" |
| style="text-align:left" | Republican
| style="text-align:left" scope="row" | 
| 1,177
| 15.4
| 9
| 1,186
| 15.5
| -1,186
| colspan="2"  style="background:lightgrey; text-align:center;"| Eliminated
|-
! style="background-color:" |
| style="text-align:left" colspan=2 | Write-in
| 40
| 0.5
| -40
| colspan="5"  style="background:lightgrey; text-align:center;"| Eliminated
|- class="sortbottom" style="background-color:#F6F6F6"
! colspan=3 scope="row" style="text-align:right;" | Total votes
! colspan=3 |7,645
! colspan=3 | 7,671
! colspan=3 |7,242
|- class="sortbottom"
|- class="sortbottom" style="background-color:#F6F6F6"
! colspan=6 scope="row" style="text-align:right;" | Blank or inactive ballots
! colspan=2 | 519
| +429
! colspan=2 | 948

District 12
Primary

General election

District 13
Primary

General election

District 14
Primary

General election
Galvin said she would join the bipartisan coalition if elected.

District 15
Primary

General election
{| class="wikitable sortable" style="text-align:right"
|+ colspan=6 | 2022 Alaska House of Representatives election, District 15
|-
! colspan=2 rowspan=2 | Party
! rowspan=2 | Candidate
! colspan=3 | First Choice
! colspan=3 | Round 1
! colspan=3 | Round 2
|-
! Votes
! %
! Transfer
! Votes
! %
! Transfer
! Votes
! %
|-
! style="background-color:" |
| style="text-align:left" | Republican
| style="text-align:left" scope="row" |  (incumbent)
| 2,812
| 38.8
| +28
| 2,840
| 39.1
| +645
| 3,485
| 50.1
|-
! style="background-color:" |
| style="text-align:left" | Democratic
| style="text-align:left" scope="row" |  
| 3,379
| 46.6
| +6
| 3,385
| 46.5
| +91
| 3,476
| 49.9
|-
! style="background-color:" |
| style="text-align:left" | Republican
| style="text-align:left" scope="row" | 
| 1,026
| 14.2
| +14
| 1,040
| 14.3
| -1,040
| colspan="2"  style="background:lightgrey; text-align:center;"| Eliminated
|-
! style="background-color:" |
| style="text-align:left" colspan=2 | Write-in
| 36
| 0.5
| -36
| colspan="5"  style="background:lightgrey; text-align:center;"| Eliminated
|- class="sortbottom" style="background-color:#F6F6F6"
! colspan=3 scope="row" style="text-align:right;" | Total votes
! colspan=3 |7,253
! colspan=3 | 7,265
! colspan=3 |6,961
|- class="sortbottom"
|- class="sortbottom" style="background-color:#F6F6F6"
! colspan=6 scope="row" style="text-align:right;" | Blank or inactive ballots
! colspan=2 | 274
| +304
! colspan=2 | 578

District 16
Primary

General election

District 17
Primary

General election

District 18
Primary

General election
{| class="wikitable sortable" style="text-align:right"
|+ colspan=6 | 2022 Alaska House of Representatives election, District 18
|-
! colspan=2 rowspan=2 | Party
! rowspan=2 | Candidate
! colspan=3 | First Choice
! colspan=3 | Round 1
! colspan=3 | Round 2
|-
! Votes
! %
! Transfer
! Votes
! %
! Transfer
! Votes
! %
|-
! style="background-color:" |
| style="text-align:left" | Democratic
| style="text-align:left" scope="row" |  
| 743
| 35.3
| +3
| 746
| 35.2
| +299
| 1,045
| 51.9
|-
! style="background-color:" |
| style="text-align:left" | Republican
| style="text-align:left" scope="row" |  (incumbent)
| 927
| 44.0
| 0
| 927
| 43.8
| +41
| 968
| 48.1
|-
! style="background-color:" |
| style="text-align:left" | Democratic
| style="text-align:left" scope="row" |  
| 426
| 20.2
| +18
| 444
| 21.0
| -444
| colspan="2"  style="background:lightgrey; text-align:center;"| Eliminated
|-
! style="background-color:" |
| style="text-align:left" colspan=2 | Write-in
| 9
| 0.4
| -9
| colspan="5"  style="background:lightgrey; text-align:center;"| Eliminated
|- class="sortbottom" style="background-color:#F6F6F6"
! colspan=3 scope="row" style="text-align:right;" | Total votes
! colspan=3 |2,105
! colspan=3 | 2,117
! colspan=3 |2,013
|- class="sortbottom"
|- class="sortbottom" style="background-color:#F6F6F6"
! colspan=6 scope="row" style="text-align:right;" | Blank or inactive ballots
! colspan=2 | 180
| +104
! colspan=2 | 284

District 19
Primary

General election

District 20
Primary

General election

District 21
Primary

General election

District 22
Primary

General election

District 23
Primary

General election

District 24
Primary

General election

District 25
Primary

General election

District 26
Primary

General election

District 27
Primary

General election

District 28
Primary

General election
{| class="wikitable sortable" style="text-align:right"
|+ colspan=6 | 2022 Alaska House of Representatives election, District 28
|-
! colspan=2 rowspan=2 | Party
! rowspan=2 | Candidate
! colspan=3 | First Choice
! colspan=3 | Round 1
! colspan=3 | Round 2
! colspan=3 | Round 3
|-
! Votes
! %
! Transfer
! Votes
! %
! Transfer
! Votes
! %
! Transfer
! Votes
! %
|-
! style="background-color:" |
| style="text-align:left" | Republican
| style="text-align:left" scope="row" | 
| 2,168
| 36.6
| +49
| 2,217
| 37.3
| +201
| 2,418
| 43.0
| +702
| 3,120
| 61.7
|-
! style="background-color:" |
| style="text-align:left" | Republican
| style="text-align:left" scope="row" | 
| 1,523
| 25.7
| +52
| 1,575
| 26.5
| +146
| 1,721
| 30.6
| +215
| 1,936
| 38.3
|-
! style="background-color:" |
| style="text-align:left" | Republican
| style="text-align:left" scope="row" | 
| 1,273
| 21.5
| +14
| 1,287
| 21.7
| +204
| 1,491
| 26.5
| -1,491
| colspan="2"  style="background:lightgrey; text-align:center;"| Eliminated
|-
! style="background-color:" |
| style="text-align:left" | Republican
| style="text-align:left" scope="row" | 
| 853
| 14.4
| +10
| 863
| 14.5
| -863
| colspan="5"  style="background:lightgrey; text-align:center;"| Eliminated
|-
! style="background-color:" |
| style="text-align:left" colspan=2 | Write-in
| 107
| 1.8
| -107
| colspan="8"  style="background:lightgrey; text-align:center;"| Eliminated
|- class="sortbottom" style="background-color:#F6F6F6"
! colspan=3 scope="row" style="text-align:right;" | Total votes
! colspan=3 |5,924
! colspan=3 | 5,942
! colspan=3 |5,630
! colspan=3 |5,056
|- class="sortbottom"
|- class="sortbottom" style="background-color:#F6F6F6"
! colspan=6 scope="row" style="text-align:right;" | Blank or inactive ballots
! colspan=2 | 1,156
| +312
! colspan=2 | 1,468
| +574
! colspan=2 | 2,042

District 29
Primary

General election

District 30
Primary

General election
{| class="wikitable sortable" style="text-align:right"
|+ colspan=6 | 2022 Alaska House of Representatives election, District 30
! colspan=2 rowspan=2 | Party
! rowspan=2 | Candidate
! colspan=3 | First Choice
! colspan=3 | Round 1
! colspan=3 | Round 2
|-
! Votes
! %
! Transfer
! Votes
! %
! Transfer
! Votes
! %
|-
! style="background-color:" |
| style="text-align:left" | Republican
| style="text-align:left" scope="row" |  (incumbent)
| 3,391
| 45.0
| +3
| 3,394
| 45.1
| +268
| 3,662
| 55.9
|-
! style="background-color:" |
| style="text-align:left" | Republican
| style="text-align:left" scope="row" | 
| 2,595
| 34.4
| +13
| 2,608
| 34.7
| +276
| 2,884
| 44.1
|-
! style="background-color:" |
| style="text-align:left" | Democratic
| style="text-align:left" scope="row" | 
| 1,506
| 20.0
| +11
| 1,517
| 20.2
| -1,517
| colspan="2"  style="background:lightgrey; text-align:center;"| Eliminated
|-
! style="background-color:" |
| style="text-align:left" colspan=2 | Write-in
| 46
| 0.6
| -46
| colspan="5"  style="background:lightgrey; text-align:center;"| Eliminated
|- class="sortbottom" style="background-color:#F6F6F6"
! colspan=3 scope="row" style="text-align:right;" | Total votes
! colspan=3 |7,538
! colspan=3 | 7,519
! colspan=3 |6,546
|- class="sortbottom"
|- class="sortbottom" style="background-color:#F6F6F6"
! colspan=6 scope="row" style="text-align:right;" | Blank or inactive ballots
! colspan=2 | 616
| +973
! colspan=2 | 1,589

District 31
Primary

General election
{| class="wikitable sortable" style="text-align:right"
|+ colspan=6 | 2022 Alaska House of Representatives election, District 31
! colspan=2 rowspan=2 | Party
! rowspan=2 | Candidate
! colspan=3 | First Choice
! colspan=3 | Round 1
! colspan=3 | Round 2
|-
! Votes
! %
! Transfer
! Votes
! %
! Transfer
! Votes
! %
|-
! style="background-color:" |
| style="text-align:left" | Democratic
| style="text-align:left" scope="row" | 
| 2,469
| 49.1
| +9
| 2,478
| 49.0
| +111
| 2,589
| 55.5
|-
! style="background-color:" |
| style="text-align:left" | Republican
| style="text-align:left" scope="row" |  (incumbent)
| 1,479
| 29.4
| +13
| 1,492
| 29.5
| +582
| 2,074
| 44.5
|-
! style="background-color:" |
| style="text-align:left" | Republican
| style="text-align:left" scope="row" | 
| 1,040
| 20.7
| +52
| 1,092
| 21.6
| -1,092
| colspan="2"  style="background:lightgrey; text-align:center;"| Eliminated
|-
! style="background-color:" |
| style="text-align:left" colspan=2 | Write-in
| 39
| 0.8
| -39
| colspan="5"  style="background:lightgrey; text-align:center;"| Eliminated
|- class="sortbottom" style="background-color:#F6F6F6"
! colspan=3 scope="row" style="text-align:right;" | Total votes
! colspan=3 |5,027
! colspan=3 | 5,062
! colspan=3 |4,663
|- class="sortbottom"
|- class="sortbottom" style="background-color:#F6F6F6"
! colspan=6 scope="row" style="text-align:right;" | Blank or inactive ballots
! colspan=2 | 268
| +399
! colspan=2 | 667

District 32
Primary

General election

District 33
Primary

General election

District 34
Primary

General election
{| class="wikitable sortable" style="text-align:right"
|+ colspan=6 | 2022 Alaska House of Representatives election, District 34
! colspan=2 rowspan=2 | Party
! rowspan=2 | Candidate
! colspan=3 | First Choice
! colspan=3 | Round 1
! colspan=3 | Round 2
|-
! Votes
! %
! Transfer
! Votes
! %
! Transfer
! Votes
! %
|-
! style="background-color:" |
| style="text-align:left" | Republican
| style="text-align:left" scope="row" | 
| 3,607
| 48.9
| +8
| 3,615
| 49.0
| +398
| 4,013
| 55.6
|-
! style="background-color:" |
| style="text-align:left" | Democratic
| style="text-align:left" scope="row" |  (incumbent)
| 3,172
| 43.0
| +3
| 3,175
| 43.2
| +25
| 3,200
| 44.4
|-
! style="background-color:" |
| style="text-align:left" | Republican
| style="text-align:left" scope="row" | 
| 575
| 7.8
| +11
| 586
| 7.9
| -586
| colspan="2"  style="background:lightgrey; text-align:center;"| Eliminated
|-
! style="background-color:" |
| style="text-align:left" colspan=2 | Write-in
| 16
| 0.2
| -16
| colspan="5"  style="background:lightgrey; text-align:center;"| Eliminated
|- class="sortbottom" style="background-color:#F6F6F6"
! colspan=3 scope="row" style="text-align:right;" | Total votes
! colspan=3 |7,370
! colspan=3 | 7,376
! colspan=3 |7,213
|- class="sortbottom"
|- class="sortbottom" style="background-color:#F6F6F6"
! colspan=6 scope="row" style="text-align:right;" | Blank or inactive ballots
! colspan=2 | 317
| +163
! colspan=2 | 480

District 35
Primary

Tim Parker withdrew from the race after the primary, which allowed Kieran Brown to advance to the general election.

General election

District 36
Primary

General election

District 37
Primary

General election

District 38
Primary

General election

District 39
Primary

General election
Ivanoff said he would not join a bipartisan coalition if elected.

District 40
Primary

General election

See also 
2022 United States Senate election in Alaska
2022 United States House of Representatives elections in Alaska
2022 United States gubernatorial elections
2022 United States state legislative elections
2022 Alaska Senate election
2022 Alaska elections

Notes

References

External links

House of Representatives
Alaska House
2022